Jaime French may refer to:

Jaime French (soccer) (born 1989), American soccer player
Jaime French (YouTuber), American YouTuber